Teretia megalembryon is a species of sea snail, a marine gastropod mollusk in the family Raphitomidae.

Description
The length of the shell attains 3 mm.

The minute, solid shell is whitish, except for the yellowish brown protoconch. The shell consists of 7 convex whorls, including 4 whorls in the protoconch. The suture is distinct, constricted, with a fringe of minute axial wrinkles on the fasciole in front of it. There are many well-developed growth lines. There is no other axial sculpture except faint incremental lines. The spiral sculpture consists of (on the penultimate whorl 6 and on the body whorl about 10) fine, equal and equally distributed low threads with narrower interspaces, covering the whole shell except the anal fasciole. The aperture is ample, hardly differentiated from the short siphonal canal. The anal sulcus is wide and rather deep. The sharp outer lip is prominently arcuate. The almost vertical columella is short, twisted, strong. The axis is minutely pervious.

Distribution
This species occurs in the Atlantic Ocean off the Azores and off Georgia, USA.

References

 Beu, A.G. 2011 Marine Molluscs of oxygen isotope stages of the last 2 million years in New Zealand. Part 4. Gastropoda (Ptenoglossa, Neogastropoda, Heterobranchia). Journal of the Royal Society of New Zealand 41, 1–153

External links
 
 Dautzenberg P. & Fischer H. (1896). Dragages effectués par l'Hirondelle et par la Princesse Alice 1888-1895. 1. Mollusques Gastéropodes. Mémoires de la Société Zoologique de France. 9: 395-498, pl. 15-22
 Dall W. H. (1927). Small shells from dredgings off the southeast coast of the United states by the United States Fisheries Steamer "Albatross", in 1885 and 1886. Proceedings of the United States National Museum, 70(18): 1-134
 Ortega, J.; Gofas, S. (2019). The unknown bathyal of the Canaries: new species and new records of deep-sea Mollusca. Zoosystema.41(26): 513-551
  Serge GOFAS, Ángel A. LUQUE, Joan Daniel OLIVER,José TEMPLADO & Alberto SERRA (2021) - The Mollusca of Galicia Bank (NE Atlantic Ocean); European Journal of Taxonomy 785: 1–114

megalembryon
Gastropods described in 1896